Mr. and Mrs. Spider-Man is a short comic strip series published in the pages of The Amazing Spider-Man Family, in August 2008. It was written by Tom DeFalco, and illustrated by Ron Frenz and several other artists.

Premise
The series took place in the MC2 universe, and bridges the gap between the final issues of DeFalco's run on The Amazing Spider-Man and his future canon in Spider-Girl, taking place shortly after the renegade clone Kaine rescued an infant "Mayday" Parker from the clutches of Norman Osborn's agents and returned her safely to her parents Peter and Mary Jane. Peter continues his career as Spider-Man and begins to cope with the additional headaches of raising an infant daughter with his wife.

According to DeFalco, the events of "The Final Chapter" take place two years after this series. Mayday is six months old when the series begins, and is two when Peter loses his leg in a final battle with the Green Goblin, ending his career as Spider-Man.

The strip was originally intended to run in the closing issue of the Spider-Man Family volume, but was held back to launch within the rebranded title. A podcast interview with DeFalco in November 2008 confirmed that, due to Spider-Girl becoming an integral part of Amazing Spider-Man Family, Mr and Mrs. Spider-Man would become a casualty and be concluded. Only four storylines were written. The strips were later collected in a trade paperback of The Spectacular Spider-Girl.

See also
 2008 in comics

References

External links
 Spider-Man: Family Ties

2008 comics debuts
Spider-Man in comics
Comic strips based on Marvel Comics publications
Superhero comic strips